Lynn C. Gardner (1877-1948) was a Republican politician from Michigan who served in the Michigan House of Representatives from 1925 through 1930. He served as Speaker of the House during the 54th Legislature.

Born to Robert and Frances Gardner in 1877, Gardner was educated in the local schools and became a farmer and teacher in Iosco Township. Gardner was a member of the Independent Order of Odd Fellows, the Grange, the Farm Bureau and the Farmers Union.

Prior to his election to the House in 1922, Gardner served on the local school board, as a township supervisor, and as justice of the peace. He was an unsuccessful candidate for the Michigan Senate in 1930. In 1939, he began a term of service on the Michigan Fair Board, and was an alternate delegate to the 1948 Republican National Convention.

References

1877 births
1948 deaths
People from Livingston County, Michigan
Farmers from Michigan
School board members in Michigan
Speakers of the Michigan House of Representatives
Republican Party members of the Michigan House of Representatives